'Ravindra Jaiswal, is an Indian politician and a member of the 16th Legislative Assembly of Uttar Pradesh of India. He represents the Varanasi North constituency of Uttar Pradesh and is a member of the Bharatiya Janata Party.

Early life and education
Ravindra Jaiswal was born in Varanasi in 1966. He holds Bachelor of Laws & Master of Commerce & Master of Business Administration from Veer Bahadur Singh Purvanchal University. Prior to entering politics from ABVP, he was a lawyer by profession. He also runs a College and Hotel in Varanasi and graduated (Master in International Business & Law) from Boston USA Hult International Business School.

Political career
Ravindra Jaiswal has been a MLA for Third term. Jaiswal represents Varanasi North constituency and is a member of the Bharatiya Janata Party. Earlier he contested in 2002 and by-election in 2005 from Varanasi North. He was arrested in Ram Janmabhoomi demolition of Babri Masjid in 1992 as Kar Seva.

He has been appointed Minister of State (Independent Charge) for stamp, court fee and registration department in Yogi Adityanath ministry on 21 August 2019.

Bibliography
Chil

Posts held

See also

Bharatiya Janata Party
Government of India
Politics of India
Uttar Pradesh Legislative Assembly
Varanasi North

References 

1966 births
Living people
Uttar Pradesh MLAs 2017–2022
Bharatiya Janata Party politicians from Uttar Pradesh
People from Varanasi district
Uttar Pradesh MLAs 2012–2017
Uttar Pradesh MLAs 2022–2027